Emily was a cow (Bos taurus) who escaped from a slaughterhouse in Hopkinton, Massachusetts, by jumping a gate and wandered for 40 days eluding capture. She found lasting refuge at "Peace Abbey" in Sherborn, Massachusetts, until her death in 2003. During her 8 years' stay in the abbey, the cow became a figurehead of animal rights and a meat-free diet.

The "Sacred Cow Animal Rights Memorial" was built on her grave with a life-sized statue of her.

Escape from the slaughterhouse
On November 14, 1995, Emily, a three-year-old heifer weighing , escaped from a slaughterhouse, A. Arena & Sons Inc,  in Hopkinton by jumping a  gate, minutes before she would have been killed. In record amounts of snow, Emily was spotted foraging through backyards for food. It was said that local townspeople helped the cow evade capture for 40 days. Elmwood Farm in Hopkinton, which donates produce to needy people in Worcester County, even started feeding her with crops produced in their land. Oftentimes, she was seen running with a herd of deer, which report made headlines in local newspapers. After several failed attempts to capture the animal, the police had been ordered to shoot her on sight.

Life at the Peace Abbey
Although the slaughterhouse set a bargain price of $350 on the cow initially, the cow was later purchased from the slaughterhouse by the Randa family for $1, who brought Emily to live in sanctuary at the Peace Abbey on Christmas Eve. When Emily was recaptured, she was found to have lost 500 pounds during her 40-day ordeal and was given veterinary treatment.

After her recapture, Emily became well known. During her stay at the Peace Abbey, Emily was visited by national and international visitors and soon became a representative of animal rights and vegetarianism. She even served as a bridesmaid in a couple of weddings. People even felt Emily's presence at the abbey and her story resonated with various religious and cultural traditions.

Within a year of Emily's arrival at the abbey, she was joined by a calf, a pair of turkeys, a mother goat with her two kids, and three rabbits, all of whom were rescued from slaughter and other inhumane conditions. In 1997, Ellen Little, producer of the 1995 film Richard III, began to work on a film on Emily's story.

Death and memorial
Emily suffered from uterine cancer and died on March 30, 2003. A week before her death, Emily was visited and blessed by Krishna Bhatta, a local Hindu priest of the Lakshmi Temple in Ashland, Massachusetts, who placed a golden thread around her leg and one through the hole in her ear that once held the number tag when she arrived at the slaughterhouse.

Emily was buried at Peace Abbey on April 2, 2003, between statues of Mother Teresa and Mahatma Gandhi. Meg and Lewis Randa commissioned artist Lado Goudjabidze to sculpt a life-sized bronze statue of Emily, adorned with a blanket and flowers, Hindu signs of respect, to stand above her grave. The statue was unveiled on Earth Day.

After Emily's death, hair clippings from her markings on the forehead and from the tail tip, traces of her blood, and a piece of golden thread placed through her ear by the Hindu priest were released into river Ganges at Benares, India, in April 2003.

References

Bibliography
  Preview in Google books

External links
 Emily the Cow from Peace Abbey
 Emily the Cow Ran Away From the Slaughterhouse And Became a Star

1990s animal births
2003 animal deaths
Animal rights
Individual cows
Animal monuments
Sherborn, Massachusetts
Individual animals in the United States
Missing or escaped animals